Marvin Gustave Staehle (March 13, 1942 – September 30, 2022) was an American Major League Baseball second baseman. He played for the Chicago White Sox (1964–1967), Montréal Expos (1969–1970), and the Atlanta Braves (1971).

Career
Staehle attended Western Illinois University and originally signed with his hometown White Sox. He was an accomplished hitter in minor league baseball, leading the Double-A Sally League in batting average (.337) with the 1963 Nashville Vols and batting .286 overall in 1,239 minor league games. However, he struggled in the Major Leagues. In his only full MLB season, with the 1970 Expos, the left-handed swinging Staehle platooned with right-handed hitter Gary Sutherland as Montreal's second baseman. He appeared in 104 games, but batted only .218 in 321 at bats.

During his 185-game, seven-year MLB career, he batted .207 with 97 hits, 1 home run, and 33 runs batted in.

References

External links

Pura Pelota (Venezuelan Winter League)

1942 births
2022 deaths
American expatriate baseball players in Canada
Arizona Instructional League Pilots players
Atlanta Braves players
Baseball players from Illinois
Chicago White Sox players
Clinton C-Sox players
Hawaii Islanders players
Indianapolis Indians players
Jacksonville Suns players
Major League Baseball second basemen
Montreal Expos players
Nashville Vols players
Navegantes del Magallanes players
American expatriate baseball players in Venezuela
Seattle Angels players
Sportspeople from Oak Park, Illinois
Syracuse Chiefs players
Toronto Maple Leafs (International League) players
Vancouver Mounties players